7V or 7-V may refer to:

7V, IATA code for Pelican Air
7v, abbreviations for 7 volts
7V, abbreviation for 7-valve engine
Force 7V, a model of  Leyland P76
UP-7V, sighting device used on the  RPG-7
Yak-7V, a model of  Yakovlev Yak-7
TBG-7V, fragmentation rocket for Rocket-propelled grenade
OG-7V, fragmentation rocket for Rocket-propelled grenade

See also
V7 (disambiguation)